The 2010–11 Belize Premier Football League (also known as the 2010–11 Caribbean Motors Cup) is the highest competitive football league in Belize, which was founded in 1991. There were two seasons, the opening (which was played at the end of 2010) and the closing (which was played at the beginning of 2011). In 2011, the Belize Premier Football League withdrew from the Football Federation of Belize and all remaining games were abandoned. Thus no winner was crowned for the closing season.

Opening season
There were significant team changes from the 2009–10 Belize Premier Football League closing season. Georgetown Ibayani, Paradise Freedom Fighters and Shanaiah Corozal left the league and in came Griga United, San Felipe Barcelona and Toledo Ambassadors. BRC Blaze were also renamed Belmopan Blaze.

The opening season started on 5 September 2010 with the regular season concluding on 23 December 2010. The playoffs, which are the teams which finished in the top 6, will then take place after this date.

On 24 November 2010, San Pedro Sea Dogs withdrew from the league.

On 30 December 2010, it was revealed by the league that Hankook Verdes would be replacing Belmopan Blaze in the playoffs, due to problems with the Blaze.

Stadia and locations

Regular stage

League table

Results
All of the results on this page have been confirmed by the Belize Premier League. All kick off times are UTC−06:00.

Round 1:

Round 2:

Round 3:

Round 4:

The Round 4 fixtures were put back a week in the schedule, meaning that they were played on 2/3 October 2010 instead of 25/26 September 2010.

Round 5:

Round 6:

Hankook Verdes beat San Pedro Sea Dogs 3–0 by default, therefore no goals were actually scored by players.

Round 7:

The Round 7 fixtures were put back a week in the schedule, meaning that they were played on 30/31 October 2010 instead of 23/24 October 2010.

Round 8:

Round 9:

Round 12:

Belmopan Blaze were awarded a victory, due to the withdrawal of San Pedro Sea Dogs.

Round 13:

Hankook Verdes were awarded a victory, due to the withdrawal of San Pedro Sea Dogs.

Round 14:

San Felipe Barcelona were awarded a victory, due to the withdrawal of San Pedro Sea Dogs.

Round 10:

Toledo Ambassadors were awarded a victory, due to the withdrawal of San Pedro Sea Dogs.

Round 11:

Griga United were awarded a victory, due to the withdrawal of San Pedro Sea Dogs.

Playoffs

Results

Quarter-Finals

Semi-Finals

Game One:

Game Two:

(*) Toledo Ambassadors win the series 4 – 1

(*) Belize Defence Force win the series 8 – 3

Championship-Finals

Game One:

Game Two:

Top scorers

Playoff goals are included.

Awards
On 10 February 2011, the Belize Premier Football League in partnership with league sponsors Caribbean Motors presented the 2010–11 Opening Season Awards.

BPFL Cup

Only four teams from the opening season competed in the BPFL Cup, with the four teams scheduled to play a triple round-robin regular season. The BPFL Cup started on 20 March 2011, with the regular season concluding on 23 April 2011. After Round 7 of the competition it was announced by BPFL Manager Marvin Ottley that the league decided to abort the remaining games of the regular season and go straight to the playoffs.

League table

Results

Round 1:

Round 2:

Round 3:

Round 4:

Round 5:

Round 6:

Round 7:

Playoffs

Results

Semi-Finals

Championship-Finals

Game One:

(*) The Belize Premier Football League withdrew from the Football Federation of Belize and subsequently the league abandoned all remaining games, therefore no winner was crowned.

Top scorers

Playoff goals are included.

References

Top level Belizean football league seasons
1
Bel